Alexia Avina is an American folk musician from Montreal, Quebec, now based in Massachusetts. Avina's signature sound is a soft blend of ambient dream pop and electronica.

History
Avina released her first set of music in 2014, an EP titled Kind Forest. Avina released her second EP in 2017 titled Surrender. Avina released her first album in 2018 titled Betting On An Island. In 2019, Avina released her second album titled All That I Can't See. Avina announced her third album on July 29, 2020, and it was released on October 9, 2020. Avina released her fourth album on April 29, 2022 titled A Little Older, released by Lost Map Records.

Discography

Studio albums
Betting On An Island (2018)
All That I Can't See (2019)
Unearth (2020)
A Little Older (2022)

Singles & EPs
"Kind Forest" (2014)
Surrender (2017)
Attitude (2019)
Fit Into (2020)
Cups (2020)
Horse's Mane (2020)
Teenage Dirtbag (2021)
How Can I Learn (2021)
Human (2022)
I Am Opening (2022)
Poison (2022)

References

Year of birth missing (living people)
Living people
American folk musicians
American women singer-songwriters
21st-century American women
Singer-songwriters from Massachusetts